Cruzville is a census-designated place in Catron County, New Mexico, United States,  northeast of Reserve. It is located in the Apache National Forest. As of the 2010 census it had a population of 72.

Demographics

Education
It is in the Reserve Independent School District.

References

External links
 Photo of Cruzville School built by the Works Progress Administration in 1938.

Census-designated places in Catron County, New Mexico
Census-designated places in New Mexico